Pierre-Jean Rémy is the pen-name of Jean-Pierre Angremy (21 March 1937 – 28 April 2010) who was a French diplomat, novelist, and essayist. He was elected to the Académie française on 16 June 1988, and won the 1986 Grand Prix du roman de l'Académie française for his novel Une ville immortelle.

Biography
Rémy was born in Angoulême, Charente, where he received his primary and secondary education. His studies at Lycée Condorcet were steeped in Latin, Greek, and literature.

Beginning in 1955, Rémy studied in Paris at the Institute of Political Studies (Institut d'études politiques), the Faculty of Law (Faculté de droit) of the University of Paris (licence-economic science), and the Sorbonne (sociology). As a Fulbright program scholar, Rémy served as an assistant to the sociologist Herbert Marcuse at Brandeis University in Massachusetts from 1958-59 before returning to Paris to finish his studies at the École nationale d'administration (ENA) in 1963 (class of "Saint-Just").

Bibliography

1962  Et Gulliver mourut de sommeil
1963  Midi ou l’Attentat
1971  Le Sac du Palais d'Été  (Gallimard)
1972  Urbanisme  (Gallimard)
1973  Les Suicidés du printemps
1973  Une mort sale  (Gallimard)
1973  La vie d'Adrian Putney, poète  (Gallimard)
1974  Ava  (Gallimard)
1974  Mémoires secrets pour servir à l'histoire de ce siècle (Gallimard)
1974  La Mort de Floria Tosca  (Gallimard)
1975  Rêver la vie  (Gallimard)
1976  La Figure dans la pierre  (Gallimard)
1977  Les Enfants du Parc  (Gallimard)
1977  Si j’étais romancier
1978  Callas, une vie
1978  Les Nouvelles Aventures du chevalier de la Barre  (Gallimard)
1979  Cordelia, ou l'Angleterre  (Gallimard)
1979  Orient-Express I  (Albin Michel)
1979  Don Giovanni, Mozart, Losey  (Albin Michel)
1979  La Petite Comtesse
1980  Salue pour moi le Monde  (Gallimard)
1980  Pandora  (Albin Michel)
1981  Un voyage d'hiver  (Gallimard)
1982  Don Juan  (Albin Michel)
1983  Le Dernier Été  (Flammarion)
1983  Mata Hari
1984  Comédies italiennes  (Flammarion)
1984  Orient-Express II
1985  La vie d’un héros  (Albin Michel)
1985  Le Vicomte épinglé  (Gallimard)
1986  Une ville immortelle  (Albin Michel), Grand Prix du roman de l'Académie française
1987  Des châteaux en Allemagne  (Flammarion)
1988  Annette, ou l’éducation des filles  (Albin Michel)
1989  Bastille, rêver un Opéra.  (Plon)
1989  Toscanes  (Albin Michel)
1990  Chine  (Albin Michel)
1991  De la photographie considérée comme un assassinat  (Albin Michel)
1991  L’Autre Éducation sentimentale  (Odile Jacob)
1991  Pays d’âge, poèmes
1992  Algérie, bords de Seine  (Albin Michel)
1993  Qui trop embrasse  (Albin Michel)
1994  Un cimetière rouge en Nouvelle-Angleterre
1994  Londres, un ABC romanesque et sentimental  (Jean-Claude Lattès)
1995  Désir d’Europe
1997  Le Rose et le Blanc
1997  Retour d'Hélène  (Gallimard)
1997  Mes grands bordeaux
1998  Aria di Roma  (Albin Michel)
1999  La Nuit de Ferrare  (Albin Michel)
2000  Demi-siècle  (Albin Michel)
2001  État de grâce. Dire perdu. Trésors et secrets du Quai d'Orsay
2002  Berlioz  (Albin Michel)
2002  Les Belles du Moulin Rouge  (Le Cherche-Midi)
2004  Dictionnaire amoureux de l'Opéra  (Plon)
2004  Chambre noire à Pékin  (Albin Michel)

References

External links
 L'Académie française 

1937 births
2010 deaths
Writers from Angoulême
Members of the Académie Française
Sciences Po alumni
École nationale d'administration alumni
Prix Renaudot winners
Grand Prix du roman de l'Académie française winners
Lycée Condorcet alumni
Commandeurs of the Légion d'honneur
Officers of the Ordre national du Mérite